David Alexander McClay (born 1959) is an Irish Anglican bishop.

Biography
McClay is the current Bishop of Down and Dromore in the Church of Ireland.

McClay was educated at Trinity College Dublin; and ordained an Anglican priest in 1988. His first post was a curacy at Magheralin. After this he held incumbencies at Kilkeel and Willowfield. His appointment as Archdeacon of Down was announced in December 2016.

He was elected Bishop of Down and Dromore on 4 November 2019. He is a leading member of the GAFCON Ireland.

References

1959 births
Living people
Archdeacons of Down
Alumni of Trinity College Dublin
Bishops of Down and Dromore
21st-century Anglican bishops in Ireland
Anglican realignment people

Evangelical Anglican bishops